Forged in Fire is an American competition series that airs on the History channel.

Forged in Fire may  also refer to:

Forged in Fire (album), a 1983 album by Anvil

See also
Forged in the Fire, a 2006 young adult novel by Ann Turnbull
Forged by Fire, an album by Greek power metal band Firewind 
Forged by Fire (novel), a realistic fiction novel by Sharon M. Draper
In Fire Forged, an anthology of stories set in the Honor Harrington universe